The first Government of Prime Minister Sali Berisha was the 63rd ruling Government of the Republic of Albania formed on 8 September 2005. Following the 3 July 2005 election, the Democratic Party formed a center-right post-electoral alliance to make a majority of seats to Parliament and form the government. The alliance consisted of five-center-right parties led by Sali Berisha managed to create a majority of 81 deputies out of 140 in the Assembly. The new government led by Sali Berisha was voted on 8 September with 84-votes Pro, and took oath on 11 September in the presence of the President of the Republic Alfred Moisiu.

Cabinet
The table below shows the ministers of the Berisha I government starting from the day of the oath, on 11 September 2005 until the day of the replacement on 17 September 2009.

The first changes during the government came in 2007, when Sokol Olldashi resigned to run in the local elections against Edi Rama for the Municipality of Tirana. The post of Minister of Interior remained vacant for about two months and the functions of Minister were transferred to Deputy Minister Gjergj Lezhja, although the presidential decree for the dismissal of Mr. Olldashi was published in March alongside other changes. Then other changes came in March of the same year from where 6 ministers were replaced. While in early May, the Prime Minister Sali Berisha had a public conflict with the Minister of Foreign Affairs Besnik Mustafaj where they both had the debate in the PM's office. Lulzim Basha was appointed in his place, who previously held the position of Minister of Public Works, Transport and Telecommunications. While Olldashi is appointed to the vacancy left by Basha.

See also
 Politics of Albania

References

External links

G63
2005 establishments in Albania
Cabinets established in 2005